Judgement 3, also known as , was a professional wrestling event promoted by DDT Pro-Wrestling (DDT). It took place on March 20, 1999, in Tokyo, Japan, at the Itabashi Green Hall. It was the third event under the Judgement name.

Storylines
Judgement 3 featured a kickboxing match and six professional wrestling matches that involved different wrestlers from pre-existing scripted feuds and storylines. Wrestlers portrayed villains, heroes, or less distinguishable characters in the scripted events that built tension and culminated in a wrestling match or series of matches.

Event
The event opened with a kickboxing match and featured an All Japan Women's Pro-Wrestling match-up between Little Frankie and Tomezo Tsunosake. The fourth match also saw the participation of Takashi Uwano from the International Wrestling Association of Japan.

Results

References

External links
The official DDT Pro-Wrestling website

3
1999 in professional wrestling
Professional wrestling in Tokyo